Håkon Eikemo Opdal (born 11 June 1982) is a Norwegian professional footballer who plays for Brann in the Eliteserien, as a goalkeeper. He has previously played for Brann and Start, where he won Tippeligaen in 2007 and the Norwegian Cup in 2004.

While playing for Brann, Opdal was awarded Kniksen Award as the best goalkeeper in Norway in 2006 and 2007, and he was also the first choice goalkeeper at the Norwegian national team where he was capped 12 times between 2006 and 2008.

Club career
Opdal was born in Odda, and played for Odda FK until he joined SK Brann in 2000. Opdal made his debut for the first team in the Third Round match of the 2001 Norwegian Football Cup against Ørn-Horten. He made his debut in Tippeligaen in the match against Rosenborg on 27 October 2002. Opdal was reserve to Ivar Rønningen for a couple of seasons, but Opdal made his breakthrough during the 2003 season, when he started some matches in Tippeligaen. Opdal became regular in the starting lineup when Rønningen was sold in the middle of the 2004 season, leaving Opdal with competition from Johan Thorbjørnsen. Opdal became a hero in one of his first starts. In a game in the 2004 Norwegian Football Cup against Bodø/Glimt the score was 3–3 at the end of regular time. In the penalty shootout, Opdal saved a penalty from Aasmund Bjørkan and later scored the winning penalty himself. Brann carried on to win the cup that year.

Opdal performance as goalkeeper in Brann was awarded with the Kniksen Award in 2006. and in 2007 Opdal was one of the most important contributors when Brann won Tippeligaen in 2007 and Opdal was again awarded the Kniksen Award. In 2008 and 2009 Opdal suffered from injuries. Opdal was made captain of Brann by Steinar Nilsen ahead of the 2009 season instead of Eirik Bakke. Opdal was the captain of Brann until the 2011 season when Rune Skarsfjord stated that he wanted an outfield player to be captain.

Opdal was Brann's first choice until Piotr Leciejewski arrived at the club in 2011, and when his contract expired after the 2011 season Opdal was not offered a contract renewal. Still without a contract, Brann wanted to sign Opdal on a short-term contract in May 2012 as both Leciejewski and Jørgen Mohus were injured, but Opdal rejected Brann's offer due to a knee-injury. Opdal joined the Danish Superliga side SønderjyskE in June 2012, and made his debut for the club in the 6–1 win against Randers in the opening match of the season.

On 25 September 2015, Opdal scored a free kick goal from the half-way line for Start against Vålerenga.

On 14 August 2018 Opdal signed a two-year deal for his former club SK Brann, starting from 1 January 2019, when his contract with IK Start expires. He announced his retirement from professional football after the 2021 season in early November 2021.

International career
Opdal played eight matches for Norway U16 in 1998, five matches for the under-17 team in 1999 and six matches for the under-18 team in 2000. He was also capped for Norway U21, where he played 13 matches between 2000 and 2002.

Opdal was called up for the senior team for the first time in May 2006, and when Thomas Myhre was injured Opdal made his debut against Serbia on 15 November 2006. Opdal played 12 matches between 2006 and 2008 and was the first choice goalkeeper for the national team. After playing in the 3–1 loss against Montenegro in March 2008, Opdal lost his position as first-choice goalkeeper to Rune Jarstein. When Jarstein was made unavailable for the friendly match against Finland in April 2009, Opdal was again called up for the national team, but stayed on the bench with Jon Knudsen playing 90 minutes.

Career statistics

Club

Honours
Norway
Tippeligaen: 2007
Norwegian Cup: 2004

Individual
Kniksen award Goalkeeper of the Year: 2006 and 2007

References

1982 births
Living people
People from Odda
Norwegian footballers
Norway international footballers
Norway under-21 international footballers
SK Brann players
SønderjyskE Fodbold players
IK Start players
Eliteserien players
Norwegian First Division players
Danish Superliga players
Kniksen Award winners
Norwegian expatriate footballers
Expatriate men's footballers in Denmark
Association football goalkeepers
Sportspeople from Vestland